Reedy River is a 1953 Australian folk musical about the 1891 Australian shearers' strike. The libretto was written by Dick Diamond with songs chosen by John Gray. Two new songs were written for the musical by Diamond with music by Miles Maxwell.

Background

The musical was previewed in 1952 in Melbourne.

Production history
The play premiered at the Melbourne New Theatre on 11 March 1953. The Sydney production featured The Bushwhackers instead of an orchestra.

It played throughout Australia over three years and was toured in England. It was seen by over 450,000 people in Australia during its first run and has been revived several times.

Contemporary reviews were mixed.

Selected songs
"Widgeegoweera Joe"
"Reedy Lagoon"
"Banks of the Condamine"
"Old Black Billy"
"Reedy River"
"Eumerella Shore"
"Click Go the Shears"
"Four Little Johnny cakes" composed by Louis Lavater
These songs were issued on an Australian 10" LP Diaphon DPR-8 in the mid 1950s. A further song "Ballad of 91" was also included on the record.

References

External links
Listing of Australian productions at AusStage
Complete copy of original song book at State Library of Victoria
1953 musicals
Australian musicals